Sithalapakkam is a residential locality of south Chennai, India. It is about 3 km away from Medavakkam. Sithalapakkam is surrounded by two lakes and a hill.  Some portion of this hill is cutout for sand and stone. Wild birds can be seen at Sithalapakkam. Though some buildings have erupted in the region, most of Sithalapakkam has tar or concrete roads and bus service to Tambaram, T. Nagar, Broadway and more also has started. It is to be pursued that the place has got access from all 3 sides public transport viz Arasankazhani on South and Chemmanjery in North. Further Perumbakkam bus depot also is at walkable distance. The 4 way road extension makes more development opportunities.

It is often confused with Chitlapakkam, which is an older neighbourhood, more established and closer to Tambaram. In general, Sithalapakkam has full-powered electricity due to the presence of  the Chemmanjery substation, and undamaged roads.

Places near Sithalapakkam 
 Arasankalani
 Sankarapuram
 Vijay Avenue
 Vedanthangal nagar
 Medavakkam
 Vengaivaasal
 Madambakkam
 Perumbakkam
 Maduraipakkam
 Semmancheri
 Sholinganallur
 Ponmar
 Ottiyambakkam
 Thalambur
 Karanai
 Navalur
 Siruseri

References

External links

 Sithalapakkam news
 An article in The Hindu praising the virtues of living in Sithalapakkam

Neighbourhoods in Chennai